Morkinsky District (Morko kundem) is an administrative and municipal district (raion), one of the fourteen in the Mari El Republic, Russia. It is located in the southeast of the republic. Its administrative center is the urban locality (an urban-type settlement) of Morki. As of the 2010 Census, the total population of the district was 32,403, with the population of Morki accounting for 30.6% of that number.

Administrative and municipal status
Within the framework of administrative divisions, Morkinsky District is one of the fourteen in the republic. It is divided into 1 urban-type settlement (an administrative division with the administrative center in the urban-type settlement (inhabited locality) of Morki) and 9 rural okrugs, all of which comprise 150 rural localities. As a municipal division, the district is incorporated as Morkinsky Municipal District. Morki Urban-Type Settlement is incorporated into an urban settlement, and the nine rural okrugs are incorporated into nine rural settlements within the municipal district. The urban-type settlement of Morki serves as the administrative center of both the administrative and municipal district.

References

Notes

Sources



Districts of Mari El